Cutter Gauthier (born January 19, 2004) is an American ice hockey player for Boston College of the National Collegiate Athletic Association. He was drafted fifth overall by the Philadelphia Flyers in the 2022 NHL Entry Draft.

Playing career
Gauthier competed at the 2022 BioSteel All-American Game.

International play

Gauthier represented the United States at the 2020 Winter Youth Olympics and won a silver medal.

Gauthier represented the United States at the 2022 IIHF World U18 Championships, where recorded three goals and six assists in six games and won a silver medal.

On December 12, 2022, Gauthier was named to the United States men's national junior ice hockey team to compete at the 2023 World Junior Ice Hockey Championships.

Personal life
Cutter is the son of Sean Gauthier, and was born during Sean's playing career in Sweden.

Career statistics

Regular season and playoffs

International

References

External links

2004 births
Living people
American men's ice hockey forwards
Boston College Eagles men's ice hockey players
Ice hockey players at the 2020 Winter Youth Olympics
National Hockey League first-round draft picks
People from Skellefteå Municipality
Philadelphia Flyers draft picks
USA Hockey National Team Development Program players
Youth Olympic silver medalists for the United States